Carroll County Public Schools is a school district located in Carrollton, Kentucky that serves all students residing in Carroll County, Kentucky.

Schools

Elementary schools
Richard B Cartmell Elementary School (Grades 2-4)
Kathryn Winn Primary School (Grades K-1)

Middle schools
Carroll County Middle School (Grades 5-8)

High schools
Carroll County High School (Kentucky)

Additional programs
Carroll County Child Development Center
Carroll County Area Technology Center

External links
Carroll County Public Schools

Education in Carroll County, Kentucky
School districts in Kentucky